The Tony Grove Ranger Station Historic District, in Cache County, Utah near Logan, Utah, was listed as a historic district on the National Register of Historic Places in 1992.

It has also been known as Tony Grove Memorial Ranger Station, or Tony Grove Nursery, or Tony Grove Ranger District.

It has an original log cabin built around 1907, or at least between 1907 and 1911, "shortly after the passage of the Sundry Civil Appropriations Act of 1897 that enabled the creation of the U.S. Forest Service. The other structures are of frame construction and were added between 1937 and 1939. Their construction was related to the use of the site as a tree nursery." The cabin is " architecturally significant as an excellent example of an early twentieth-century log cabin. Its saw-hewn logs and half-dovetail notching exhibit a level of craftsmanship unmatched by other extant cabins of the period in this area."

It was home of the Tony Grove Nursery established in 1936 with goal to produce seedlings to revive national forests in Utah and Idaho.  Various nursery-related buildings were built by the Civilian Conservation Corps (CCC), and 1.5 million 
seedlings were started at the nursery.  Nursery stock produced, valued at $17,954, was delivered in 1942 to the School of Forestry at Utah State Agricultural College and to fourteen national forests in U.S. Forest Service Region IV.

The ranger station was restored and was going to be made available for rental in 2016.

References

United States Forest Service ranger stations
Historic districts on the National Register of Historic Places in Utah
National Register of Historic Places in Cache County, Utah
Buildings and structures completed in 1907